Red devil cichlid is a common name for several fishes and may refer to:
Amphilophus labiatus, endemic to Lake Managua and Lake Nicaragua in Nicaragua
Amphilophus citrinellus, endemic to the San Juan River and adjacent watersheds in Costa Rica and Nicaragua

See also 
Red Devil (disambiguation)